Vecchione is an Italian surname. Notable people with the surname include:

Bartolomeo Vecchione, Italian architect
Carlo Vecchione (born 1988), Italian footballer
Felice Vecchione (born 1991), German footballer
Michael Vecchione, American zoologist
Jeremiah Vecchione(born 1973), Naval architect

Italian-language surnames